Mühlenstein is a high hill of Hesse, Germany.

Hills of Hesse